Pakistan competed in the first ever South Asian Winter Games held in Dehradun and Auli, India, from 10 January to 16 January 2011. It sent a contingent of 27 officials and athletes. It participated in slalom, giant slalom, cross-country skiing, and biathlon events.

Medals table

Alpine skiing
 Ifrah Wali
 Amina Wali
 Mir Nawaz
 Muhammad Abbas

Nordic

Cross-country

Biathlon

References

2011 South Asian Winter Games
2011 in Pakistani sport
Pakistan at the South Asian Games